Union of Writers may refer to:

 USSR Union of Writers formed in 1932
 Union of Russian Writers, a non-governmental organization formed in 1991
 Moldovan Writers' Union
 Nazi Writers Union
 L'Union des Ecrivains formed in France in 1968
 Members included: 
 Françoise Mallet-Joris (1930–2016)
 Alain Jouffroy (1928–2015)
 Jean-Paul Sartre (1905–1980)
 Eugène Guillevic (1907–1997)
 Michel Butor (1926–2016)